George Lewis Calwell (2 July 1891 – 24 August 1971) was an Australian rules footballer who played for Carlton in the Victorian Football League (VFL).

Calwell was born in Carlton and was the eldest child of George Lewis Calwell snr and Caroline Alice Corrigan. Two of his younger brothers, Clarrie and Bert, also played VFL football. Calwell initially worked as a policeman before being dismissed after firing a pistol and endangering colleagues during a struggle with fellow officers at the Russell-street police station.

Originally from the Clifton's Rope Works team, Calwell made his league debut for Carlton in 1914 and, despite not initially taking part in that's years finals series, was recalled for the Grand Final. Carlton wanted his pace around the packs and put him in the first ruck, a decision which helped them to claim the premiership.

A foot injury caused him to miss out on playing in Carlton's premiership team the following season. By now he had enlisted for active service and was assigned to the Corps of Engineers for specialist training at Langwarrin. He was however picked in the 1916 Grand Final, his first match since late in the 1915 season.

Just weeks after the Grand Final, Calwell was told by army doctors that he was suffering from a degenerative condition in the joints of the toes. He was discharged as medically unfit and never played for Carlton again.

References

1891 births
Australian rules footballers from Melbourne
Carlton Football Club players
Carlton Football Club Premiership players
Australian military personnel of World War I
1971 deaths
One-time VFL/AFL Premiership players
People from Carlton, Victoria
Military personnel from Melbourne